Albino Friaça Cardoso (October 20, 1924 – January 12, 2009), best known as simply Friaça, was a Brazilian football striker.

He was born in Porciúncula. During his career (1944 – 1955) he played for Vasco da Gama, São Paulo and Ponte Preta. He won two Rio de Janeiro State Tournaments (1947, 1952), one São Paulo State Tournament (1949, in which he was also the top goalscorer), and the South American Championship of Champions (1948). With the Brazil national team he won one Copa América in 1949, and participated at 1950 FIFA World Cup, playing 4 matches and scoring the opening goal in the title-deciding match against Uruguay, which Brazil lost 1–2.

He died in Itaperuna in January 2009, aged 84, of pneumonia related organ failure.

References

External links
 

1924 births
2009 deaths
Footballers from Rio de Janeiro (city)
1950 FIFA World Cup players
Associação Atlética Ponte Preta players
Brazilian footballers
Brazil international footballers
CR Vasco da Gama players
Association football forwards
São Paulo FC players
Deaths from multiple organ failure